John Brodie (born 5 January 1896) was a Scottish footballer who played for Celtic, Dumbarton, Ayr United and Chelsea.

References

1896 births
Scottish footballers
Dumbarton F.C. players
Celtic F.C. players
Ayr United F.C. players
Chelsea F.C. players
Scottish Football League players
English Football League players
Year of death missing
Maryhill F.C. players
Association football forwards